Tilarán is a small town and a district in Guanacaste Province in Costa Rica. It is the seat of the Tilarán Canton located in the hills overlooking the west shore of Lake Arenal. It is connected by road to El Silencio, and by the 142 road down through the Cordillera de Tilarán hills to Tejona. The area between Tilaran and Tejona is one of the most important wind farms in Costa Rica and turbines are prominent on the landscape. Animal husbandry also forms an important part of the local economy.

Geography 
Tilarán has an area of  km² and an elevation of  metres.

Locations 
 Barrios: Cabra, Carmen, Juan XXIII, Lomalinda
 Poblados: Cuatro Esquinas, Chiripa, Piamonte, Río Chiquito, San Luis, Tejona, Tres Esquinas

Demographics 

For the 2011 census, Tilarán had a population of  inhabitants. The main religion is Roman Catholicism and the town lies at the center of the Roman Catholic Diocese of Tilarán.

Transportation

Road transportation 
The district is covered by the following road routes:
 National Route 142
 National Route 145
 National Route 925
 National Route 926

It is connected by road to El Silencio, and via the 142 road down through the Cordillera de Tilarán hills to Tejona.

Economy 
The area between Tilaran and Tejona is one of the most important wind farms in Costa Rica and turbines are prominent on the landscape. Animal husbandry also forms an important part of the local economy.

Notable people
 Doris Murillo Boniche – Local artist, retired art professor.
Leonidas Flores – retired footballer
 Carlos Palacios Herrera – Professional cyclist
 Luis Esteban Herrera – Pianist
 Mark List – Driver on the Monster Jam circuit
 Danadith Tayals – Poet
 Manuel Vargas – Sculptor

References

External links
 Tilaran
 Servicios de Internet

Districts of Guanacaste Province
Populated places in Guanacaste Province